Cage Script (styled as CAGE SCRIPT) is the debut album by American DJ and producer K?d, released on December 9, 2022.

Background 
The concept of the album was first announced on Twitter on March 6, 2019, although was originally announced as an extended play.

The album consists of 12 songs, including five singles, "Return to Nothingness", "Flow in You" featuring South Korean vocalist June One, "If This is a Dream", "Three in the Morning" featuring vocalist Cecilia Gault, and "Protect Me" featuring Yadosan. The final album features additional features from Japanese producers Masayoshi Limori and KOTONOHOUSE, and Japanese vocalist . Accompanying the album, an anime-inspired music video have also been released. The tracks of the album and music videos recounts the story of an universe in which k?d finds himself, being described as a "story in the k?d universe" by K?d in an interview with Your EDM.

Reception 
Cameron Sunkel of Edm.com described the album as "a diverse fusion of genres" and showing K?d's "versitility on the production side," and that the album "packs an unexpected twist. There's many moments throughout the LP listeners find themselves on their toes," citing the hard dance-style drop of the track "Experience".

Track listing

References

2022 debut albums